Pradeep Sangwan (born 5 November 1990) is an Indian cricketer, who represents Delhi in first-class cricket.

Career
Sangwan is a left-arm medium pace bowler. He is quite handy with the bat as well. In Twenty20s he has achieved an average of 11.13 and a top score of 29 not out in 41 innings.

Under 15
Coached by AN Sharma, Sangwan was a member of the Delhi U-15 Team in 2005. He took 31 wickets in 6 matches and also scored 63 in a partnership of 150 for the last wicket in the final in Kolkata.

Under-19 World Cup 2008
Sangwan was a member of the victorious Indian team at the Under-19 World Cup held in Malaysia in 2008 and bowled several incisive spells with the new ball. He was instrumental to India's success at the 2008 Under-19 World Cup, which was led by Virat Kohli.
He took 8 wickets, including a spell of 5-44 that was crucial in India's victory against South Africa in the group stage. He has been named as the captain of the Delhi T20 team for the Syed Mushtaq Ali Trophy 2018 and he replaced Rishabh Pant as a captain.

Indian Premier League
Sangwan was the first U-19 pick at the inaugural IPL draft, and was bought by the Delhi Daredevils. He was picked up by Kolkata Knight Riders in the 4th Season of IPL (2011). In January 2018, he was bought by the Mumbai Indians in the at a sum of 1.5 crores 2018 IPL auction. In February 2022, he was bought by the Gujarat Titans in the auction for the 2022 Indian Premier League tournament.

Ranji Trophy
In his debut season of the Ranji trophy for Delhi in 2007–08, Sangwan took 33 wickets at an average of 19.24 and also scored 122 runs at an average of 20.33. He took 9 wickets in the final against Uttar Pradesh.

Doping
Pradeep Sangwan tested positive in a random dope test conducted during the 2013 IPL season. His 'A' samples reportedly showed presence of banned substances.

References

Indian cricketers
Delhi cricketers
1990 births
Living people
Delhi Capitals cricketers
Kolkata Knight Riders cricketers
North Zone cricketers
India Blue cricketers
Doping cases in cricket
Gujarat Lions cricketers
Gujarat Titans cricketers